Freedom on the Net is an annual report providing analytical reports and numerical ratings regarding the state of Internet freedom for countries worldwide, published by the American non-profit research and advocacy group Freedom House. The countries surveyed represent a sample with a broad range of geographical diversity and levels of economic development, as well as varying levels of political and media freedom.

Methodology
The surveys ask a set of questions designed to measure each country's level of Internet and digital media freedom, as well as the access and openness of other digital means of transmitting information, particularly mobile phones and text messaging services. Results are presented for three areas: p.31
 Obstacles to Access: infrastructural and economic barriers to access; governmental efforts to block specific applications or technologies; legal and ownership control over internet and mobile phone access providers.
 Limits on Content: filtering and blocking of websites; other forms of censorship and self-censorship; manipulation of content; the diversity of online news media; and usage of digital media for social and political activism.
 Violations of User Rights: legal protections and restrictions on online activity; surveillance and limits on privacy; and repercussions for online activity, such as legal prosecution, imprisonment, physical attacks, or other forms of harassment.
The results from the three areas are combined into a total score for a country (from 100 for "Most Free" to 0 for "Least Free") and countries are rated as "Free" (100 to 70), "Partly Free" (69 to 40), or "Not Free" (39 to 0) based on the totals. p.31

Results
Starting in 2009 Freedom House has produced eleven editions of the report.
There was no report in 2010. The reports generally cover the period from June through May.

2020 results

Comparison with Other Datasets 
Several other organizations measure internet freedom, such as the V-Dem Institute, Access Now, and the OpenNet Initiative.  V-Dem's Digital Society project measures a range of questions related to internet censorship, misinformation online, and internet shutdowns using surveys of experts.  Access Now maintains an annual list of internet shutdowns, throttling, and blockages as part of the #KeepItOn project.  The OpenNet Initiative formerly kept data on internet censorship of particular websites.  Freedom on the Net's report covers a range of concepts that the other datasets do not, such as new legislation passed, but lacks the country coverage of other datasets. 

Expert surveys such as Freedom House and V-Dem have been found to be more prone to false positives (the are more likely to find uncorroborated instances of censorship).  While remote sensing such as the kind done by Access Now and OpenNet Initiative are more likely to be prone to false negatives (they may miss some instances of real censorship).

The Millennium Challenge Corporation used the Key Internet Controls portion of the Freedom on the Net report to inform its country selection process until 2020 when this report was replaced with data on internet shutdowns from Access Now.

References

Digital rights
Works about the Internet